Owen's may refer to:

Owen's Defence, a chess opening
Owen's Market, an Indiana grocery store chain owned by Kroger

See also
Owens (disambiguation)